Han Yu (born October 6, 2000 in Beijing, China) is a Chinese female curler.

Career
Han represented China at the 2019 World Junior Curling Championships throwing fourth stones for Jiang Jiayi. The team went 8-1 through the round robin, which earned them the number one seed in the playoffs. In the playoffs, they lost the semi-final to Russia's Vlada Rumiantseva and the bronze medal game to Switzerland, settling for fourth place.

Han, still of junior age, skipped the Chinese national team to a gold medal at the 2019 Pacific-Asia Curling Championships following a 10-3 victory over Japan's Seina Nakajima. The victory earned a spot for China at the 2020 World Women's Curling Championship, which was cancelled due to COVID-19. A year later, Han skipped China at the 2021 World Women's Curling Championship, finishing tenth with a 6–7 record.

Personal life
Han attended Beijing Sport University.

Teams

Women's

Mixed

Mixed doubles

References

External links

Han Yu - Athlete Information - 2016 Winter Youth Olympics profile (web archive)

Living people
2000 births
Chinese female curlers
Curlers at the 2016 Winter Youth Olympics
Pacific-Asian curling champions
Sportspeople from Beijing
Curlers at the 2022 Winter Olympics
Olympic curlers of China
Competitors at the 2023 Winter World University Games
Medalists at the 2023 Winter World University Games
21st-century Chinese women